Denmark competed at the 1976 Summer Olympics in Montreal, Quebec, Canada. 66 competitors, 56 men and 10 women, took part in 40 events in 15 sports, winning a total number of three medals.

Medalists

Gold
 Valdemar Bandolowski, Erik Hansen and Poul Richard Høj Jensen — Sailing, Men's Soling class

Bronze
 Niels Fredborg — Cycling, Men's 1000 metres time trial
 Verner Blaudzun, Gert Frank, Jørgen Hansen and Jørn Lund — Cycling, Men's team time trial

Archery

Olympic veteran Arne Jacobsen was the only archer to represent Denmark in the nation's second appearance in the Olympic archery competition.  He dropped 89 points from his previous mark, falling 17 places in the standings.

Men's Individual Competition:
 Arne Jacobsen – 2334 points (→ 25th place)

Athletics

Men's Marathon
 Jørgen Jensen — 2:20:44 (→ 28th place)

Men's High Jump
 Jesper Tørring
 Qualification — 2.16m
 Final — 2.18m (→ 8th place)

Boxing

Canoeing

Cycling

Eleven cyclists represented Denmark in 1976.

Individual road race
 Verner Blaudzun — did not finish (→ no ranking)
 Jørgen Emil Hansen — did not finish (→ no ranking)
 Bent Pedersen — did not finish (→ no ranking)
 Willy Skibby — did not finish (→ no ranking)

Team time trial
 Verner Blaudzun
 Gert Frank
 Jørgen Emil Hansen
 Jørn Lund

Sprint
 Niels Fredborg — 6th place

1000m time trial
 Niels Fredborg — 1:07.617 (→  Bronze Medal)

Team pursuit
 Ivar Jakobsen
 Kim Refshammer
 Bjarne Sørensen
 Kim Svendsen

Equestrian

Fencing

One female fencer represented Denmark in 1976.

Women's foil
 Annie Madsen

Gymnastics

Handball

Modern pentathlon

Two male pentathletes represented Denmark in 1976.

Individual
 Jørn Steffensen
 Klaus Petersen

Rowing

Sailing

Open

Shooting

Bo Lilja

Swimming

Weightlifting

References

Nations at the 1976 Summer Olympics
1976 Summer Olympics
Summer Olympics